The Peugeot Type 105 was a large vehicle unveiled by Peugeot in 1908.  The available body styles included double phaéton, landaulet, limousine, and sport.  However, most were built as closed-top limousines.  Total production lasted less than two years and saw the production of 23 units.  Low production numbers and many available styles ensured almost complete uniqueness of each Type 105.

Performance
The engine was the first from Peugeot with six cylinders — an enormous 11.1 L straight-6 which produced a not inconsiderable , more powerful than the contemporary Rolls-Royce Silver Ghost and virtually all other vehicles on the market at the time.

References
Peugeot Car Models from 1889 to 1909
Company history of the Type 105

Type 105
Cars introduced in 1908
Brass Era vehicles